Gogodala is a Papuan language of Papua New Guinea. Its closest relative is the Ari language.

Phonology 

 can have allophones .

 can have allophones .

References

Capell, Arthur. 1969. A Survey of New Guinea Languages. Sydney: University of Sydney.
Voorhoeve, C.L., 1970. Some notes on the Suki-Gogodala subgroup of the Central and South New Guinea phylum. In S. A. Wurm & D. C. Laycock, eds. Pacific Linguistic Studies in honour of Arthur Capell. Canberra: Pacific Linguistics.

Gogodala–Suki languages
Languages of Western Province (Papua New Guinea)